Schrade is a German surname. Notable people with the surname include:

 Christian Schrade (1876–1962), German architect
 Leo Schrade (1903–1964), American musicologist
 Ulrich Schrade (1943–2009), Polish philosopher, educationist, and ethicist

German-language surnames